Alan Hale Sr. (born Rufus Edward Mackahan; February 10, 1892 – January 22, 1950) was an American actor and director. He is best remembered for his many character roles, in particular as a frequent sidekick of Errol Flynn, as well as films supporting Lon Chaney, Wallace Beery, Douglas Fairbanks, James Cagney, Clark Gable, Cary Grant, Humphrey Bogart, and Ronald Reagan. Hale was usually billed as Alan Hale and his career in film lasted 40 years. His son, Alan Hale Jr., also became an actor and remains most famous for playing "the Skipper" on the television series Gilligan's Island.

Early life
Hale was born Rufus Edward Mackahan in Washington, D.C. He studied to be an opera singer.

Career
His first film role was in the 1911 silent movie The Cowboy and the Lady. He became a leading man while working in 1913–1915 for the Biograph Company in their special feature film productions sponsored and controlled by Marc Klaw and Abraham Erlanger. Later, he became more of a character actor; he played "Little John" in the film Robin Hood (1922), with Douglas Fairbanks and Wallace Beery, reprised the role 16 years later in The Adventures of Robin Hood (1938) with Errol Flynn and Basil Rathbone, then played him once more in Rogues of Sherwood Forest (1950) with John Derek as Robin Hood's son, a unique 28-year string of portrayals of the same character in theatrical films. Hale played Hugh O'Neill, Earl of Tyrone, in The Private Lives of Elizabeth and Essex (1939), featuring a pivotal confrontation with the Earl of Essex, portrayed by Flynn.

His other films include the epic The Trap (1922) with Lon Chaney, Skyscraper (1928); as well as Fog Over Frisco with Bette Davis; Miss Fane's Baby Is Stolen with Baby LeRoy and William Frawley; The Little Minister with Katharine Hepburn; and It Happened One Night with Clark Gable and Claudette Colbert; (all released in 1934); Stella Dallas with Barbara Stanwyck; High, Wide, and Handsome (both 1937) with Irene Dunne and Dorothy Lamour; The Fighting 69th with James Cagney and Pat O'Brien; They Drive By Night with George Raft and Humphrey Bogart; Virginia City (all 1940) with Errol Flynn, Randolph Scott, and Humphrey Bogart; Manpower (1941) with Edward G. Robinson, Marlene Dietrich, and George Raft; and as the cantankerous Sgt. McGee in the This Is the Army (1943) with Irving Berlin. He also co-starred with Errol Flynn and Olivia de Havilland in the successful western film Dodge City (1939) where he played the slightly dimwitted but likeable and comical Rusty Hart, sidekick to Flynn's character, Sheriff Wade Hatton. Hale co-starred with Errol Flynn in 13 movies.

Hale directed eight movies during the 1920s and 1930s and acted in 235 theatrical films in total.

Hale also had success as an inventor. Among his innovations were a sliding theater chair (to allow spectators to slide back to admit newcomers rather than standing), the hand fire extinguisher, and greaseless potato chips.

Personal life

Hale's wife of over 30 years was Gretchen Hartman (1897–1979), a former child actress, silent film player, and mother of the couple's three children.

He was the father of actor Alan Hale Jr., best known as "the Skipper" in the Gilligan's Island television series. Father and son closely resembled one another, leading to occasional confusion after Hale Sr.'s death when Hale Jr. dropped the Jr. from his name. Hale Sr. and Hale Jr. both played the same character, Porthos the musketeer, in movies 40 years apart. Alan Hale Sr. played the character in the 1939 film Man in the Iron Mask, while Alan Hale Jr. played him in The Fifth Musketeer in 1979.

Alan Hale Sr. died at age 57 in Hollywood, California, on January 22, 1950, following a liver ailment and viral infection. He is interred in the Forest Lawn Memorial Park Cemetery in Glendale, California, next to his wife.

Filmography

 The Cowboy and the Lady (1911, film debut) 
 Jane Eyre (1914)
 Strongheart (1914) as Ralph Thorne
 The Woman in Black (1914)
 Pudd'nhead Wilson (1916) as Tom Driscoll
 The Purple Lady (1916) as Count Louis Petelier
 The Woman in the Case (1916) as Julian Rolfe
 The Beast (1916)
 Rolling Stones (1916) as Jerry Braden
 The Scarlet Oath (1916) as John Huntington
 The Love Thief (1916) as Captain Arthur Boyce
 The Americano (1916)
 The Price She Paid (1917) as Stanley Baird
 One Hour (1917) as G.D. Stanley
 Life's Whirlpool (1917) as Dr. Henry Grey
 The Eternal Temptress (1917) as Count Rudolph Frizel
 Moral Suicide (1918) as 'Lucky' Travers
 The Four Horsemen of the Apocalypse (1921) as Karl von Hartrott
 The Barbarian (1921) as Mark Grant
 A Voice in the Dark (1921) as Dr. Hugh Sainsbury
 A Wise Fool (1921) as George Masson
 Over the Wire (1921) as James Twyford
 The Fox (1921) as Rufus B. Coulter
 The Great Impersonation (1921) as Gustave Seaman
 One Glorious Day (1922) as Ben Wadley
 A Doll's House (1922) as Torvald Helmer
 The Trap (1922) as Benson
 The Dictator (1922) as Sabos
 Robin Hood (1922) as Little John
 Shirley of the Circus (1922) as Max
 Quicksands (1923) as Ferrago
 The Covered Wagon (1923) as Sam Woodhull
 Hollywood (1923) as himself (cameo) 
 Main Street (1923) as Miles Bjornstam
 The Eleventh Hour (1923) as Prince Stefan de Bernie
 Cameo Kirby (1923) as Colonel Moreau
 Long Live the King (1923) as King Karl
 Black Oxen (1923) as Prince Rohenhauer
 Code of the Wilderness (1924) as Willard Masten
 Girls Men Forget (1924) as Jimmy Masson
 One Night in Rome (1924) as Duke Mareno
 For Another Woman (1924)
 Troubles of a Bride (1924) as Gordon Blake
 Dick Turpin (1925) as Tom King
 Flattery (1925) as Arthur Barrington
 The Crimson Runner (1925) as Gregory
 The Wedding Song (1925, director)
 The Scarlet Honeymoon (1925, director)
 Ranger of the Big Pines (1925)
 Braveheart (1925) (directed)
 Hearts and Fists (1926) as Preston Tolley
 Forbidden Waters (1926, director)
 Vanity (1927) as 'Happy' Dan Morgan
 Rubber Tires (1927) (directed)
 The Wreck of the Hesperus (1927) as Singapore Jack
 The Leopard Lady (1928) as Caesar
 Skyscraper (1928) as Slim Strede
 The Cop (1928) as Mather
 Oh, Kay! (1928) as Jansen
 Power (1928) as Hanson
 Sal of Singapore (1928) as Captain Ericsson
 The Spieler (1928) as Flash
 The Leatherneck (1929) as Otto Schmidt
 Sailor's Holiday (1929) as Adam Pike
 The Sap (1929) as Jim Belden
 Red Hot Rhythm (1929) as Walter
 She Got What She Wanted (1930) as Dave
 Aloha (1931) as Stevens
 The Night Angel (1931) as Bezel
 Susan Lenox (Her Fall and Rise) (1931) as Jeb Mondstrum
 The Sin of Madelon Claudet (1931) as Hubert
 U-67 (1931) as Greg Winters
 The Sea Ghost (1931) as Capt. Greg Winters
 Union Depot (1932) as The Baron – a.k.a. Bushy Sloan
 So Big! (1932) as Klass Poole
 Rebecca of Sunnybrook Farm (1932) as Mr. Simpson
 The Match King (1932) as Borglund
 What Price Decency (1933) as Klaus van Leyden
 The Eleventh Commandment (1933) as Max Stager
 Destination Unknown (1933) as Lundstrom
 Miss Fane's Baby Is Stolen (1934) as Sam
 The Lost Patrol (1934) as Cook
 It Happened One Night (1934) as Danker
 Picture Brides (1934) as Von Luden
 Little Man, What Now? (1934) as Holger Jachman
 Fog Over Frisco (1934) as Chief O'Malley
 Of Human Bondage (1934) as Emil Miller
 The Scarlet Letter (1934) as Bartholomew Hockings
 Imitation of Life (1934) as Martin the Furniture Man
 Great Expectations (1934) as Joe Gargery
 There's Always Tomorrow (1934) as Henry
 Broadway Bill (1934) as Orchestra Leader (uncredited)
 Babbitt (1934) as Charlie McKelvey
 The Little Minister (1934) as Rob Dow
 Grand Old Girl (1935) as Click Dade
 The Good Fairy (1935) as Maurice Schlapkohl
 The Crusades (1935) as Blondel
 The Last Days of Pompeii (1935) as Burbix
 Another Face (1935) as Charles L. Kellar – Studio Head
 Two in the Dark (1936) as Police Inspector Florio
 A Message to Garcia (1936) as Dr. Ivan Krug
 The Country Beyond (1936) as Jim Alison
 Parole! (1936) as John Borchard
 Yellowstone (1936) as John Alexander Hardigan
 Our Relations (1936) as Joe Grogan -Denker's waiter
 God's Country and the Woman (1937) as Bjorn Skalka 
 Jump for Glory (1937, a.k.a. When Thief Meets Thief) as Jim Diall 'Col. Fane'
 Thin Ice (1937) as Baron
 The Prince and the Pauper (1937) as Captain of the Guard
 High, Wide, and Handsome (1937) as Walt Brennan
 Stella Dallas (1937) as Ed Munn
 Music for Madame (1937) as Detective Flugelman
 The Adventures of Marco Polo (1938) as Kaidu
 Four Men and a Prayer (1938) as Mr. Furnoy
 The Adventures of Robin Hood (1938) as John Little, a.k.a. Little John
 Algiers (1938) as Grander
 Valley of the Giants (1938) as 'Ox' Smith
 The Sisters (1938) as Sam Johnson
 Listen, Darling (1938) as J.J. Slattery
 Pacific Liner (1939) as Gallagher
 Dodge City (1939) as Algernon 'Rusty' Hart
 The Man in the Iron Mask (1939) as Porthos
 Dust Be My Destiny (1939) as Mike Leonard
 The Private Lives of Elizabeth and Essex (1939) as Earl of Tyrone
 On Your Toes (1939) as Sergei Alexandrovitch
 The Fighting 69th (1940) as Sgt. 'Big Mike' Wynn
 Green Hell (1940) as Doctor Loren
 Alice in Movieland (1940, Short) as Carlo's Guest (uncredited) 
 Three Cheers for the Irish (1940) as Gallagher
 Virginia City (1940) as Olaf "Moose" Swenson
 The Sea Hawk (1940) as Carl Pitt
 They Drive by Night (1940) as Ed J. Carlsen
 Tugboat Annie Sails Again (1940) as Capt. Bullwinkle
 Santa Fe Trail (1940) as Tex Bell
 The Strawberry Blonde (1941) as Old Man Grimes
 The Great Mr. Nobody (1941) as 'Skipper' Martin
 Footsteps in the Dark (1941) as Inspector Mason
 Thieves Fall Out (1941) as Rodney Barnes
 Manpower (1941) as Jumbo Wells
 The Smiling Ghost (1941) as Norton
 Captains of the Clouds (1942) as 'Tiny' Murphy
 Juke Girl (1942) as Yippee
 Desperate Journey (1942) as Flight Sergeant Kirk Edwards
 Gentleman Jim (1942) as Pat Corbett
 Action in the North Atlantic (1943) as Alfred "Boats" O'Hara
 This Is the Army (1943) as Sgt. McGee
 Thank Your Lucky Stars (1943) as Alan Hale
 Destination Tokyo (1943) as 'Cookie' Wainwright
 The Adventures of Mark Twain (1944) as Steve Gillis
 Make Your Own Bed (1944) as Walter Whirtle
 Janie (1944) as Prof. Matthew Q. Reardon
 Hollywood Canteen (1944) as himself (cameo)
 Roughly Speaking (1945) as Lew Morton
 Hotel Berlin (1945) as Herman Plottke
 God Is My Co-Pilot (1945) as Big Mike Harrigan
 Escape in the Desert (1945) as Dr. Orville Tedder
 Perilous Holiday (1946) as Dr. Lilley
 Night and Day (1946) as Leon Dowling
 The Time, the Place and the Girl (1946) as John Braden
 The Man I Love (1947) as Riley
 That Way with Women (1947) as Herman Brinker
 Pursued (1947) as Jake Dingle
 Cheyenne (1947) as Fred Durkin
 My Wild Irish Rose (1947) as John Donovan
 My Girl Tisa (1948) as Dugan
 Adventures of Don Juan (1948) as Leporello
 Whiplash (1948) as Terrance O'Leary
 South of St. Louis (1949) as Jake Everts
 The Younger Brothers (1949) as Sheriff Knudson
 The House Across the Street (1949) as J.B. Grinnell
 Always Leave Them Laughing (1949) as Sam Washburn
 The Inspector General (1949) as Kovatch
 Stars in My Crown (1950) as Jed Isbell
 Colt .45 (1950) as Sheriff Harris
 Rogues of Sherwood Forest (1950) as Little John (final film)

See also

References

Further reading

External links

 
 
 

1892 births
1950 deaths
20th-century American male actors
American male film actors
American male silent film actors
Burials at Forest Lawn Memorial Park (Glendale)
Deaths from kidney failure
Male Western (genre) film actors
Male actors from Washington, D.C.
Warner Bros. contract players